Celosia argentea var. cristata (formerly Celosia cristata), known as cockscomb, is the cristate or crested variety of the species Celosia argentea. It was likely originally native to India, where it was saved from extinction in cultivation by the religious significance attached to the variety by Indian, Burmese, and Chinese gardeners who planted it near temples. The name cockscomb is used because the flower looks like the head on a rooster (cock). The plants are resistant to most diseases, and grow equally well indoors or out, though the perfect place is one with no shade and a well-drained soil, as the plant is susceptible to fungal diseases.

The plant is mainly cultivated as an ornamental plant for its spectacular flowering and is highly appreciated by horticulturists for its distinctive inflorescence, in the form of wavy crest. The flowers can be cut and dried to make dry bouquets and are used frequently as ornamental plants indoors. Their leaves and flowers can be used as vegetables. They are often grown as food in India, Western Africa, and South America.

The somatic chromosome number for the cristate variety is 2n = 36, while investigation of the typical species revealed a chromosome number of 2n = 72.

Description
They are annual plants of tropical origin and are herbaceous meaning they lack a woody stem, with a straight, juicy and unbranched stem. Its elliptic leaves lanceolate, are green or red-tanned with terminal inflorescences, thick and flattened, velvety, in the form of ridge crest, in the colors red, whitish, roseate or creamy yellow. They grow well in both humid and arid conditions, and their flowers can last for up to 8 weeks.  A high number of seeds can be produced by each flower, up to 1,500 per gram or 43,000 per ounce.

The leaves are either green or bronze/maroon, depending upon the cultivar. The flower can be broken into three parts: their spikes, plumes and crests vary from one another but have standard commonalities—they are usually brightly colored, usually red, yellow, pink, or orange, though other colors can be present. In some instances, a variety of colors are present in hybrids.

Cultivation
Cockscomb can be grown easily from seed. The plant is of tropical origin, but can also be grown in summer months in colder climates. It is an annual, living for only about one fourth of a year. The plant likes well-drained soils rich in organic matter and prefers full or partial sun. Seeds can be sown indoors from March to May; then seedlings should be transplanted into the garden sometime during May to June. It is necessary to water the plants copiously during the summer, and they will bloom until frost.

Cockscomb is relatively easy to grow and care for. It has few insect pests, although some mites are known to feed on the plants. The plants are susceptible to leaf spot and root rot which can be managed with proper watering.  Wetting the leaf and flowers should be avoided as this can lead to fungal diseases. 

Cultivars include 'Jewel box', 'Century mix', 'New Look', and 'Pink Castle'. The variety of shapes and colors of flowers and leaves make the cultivars of Celosia argentea globally popular ornamental plants.

Range
The octoploid form of the variant argentea is the one found worldwide in tropics and subtropics. The tetraploid form occurs only in central and southern India. About the varieties of cristata and plumosa are only cultural references from India, Burma and China handed down, where they have long been planted in the vicinity of religious sites and gardens. In nature, they do not seem to occur, because the plants produce few seeds. The provenance of these cultivated forms is unclear despite several investigations.

Uses
Similar to amaranth, the cockscomb is used as a vegetable. It is the most widely used leafy vegetable in southern Nigeria, and is also part of the diet in Benin, Congo and Indonesia. It is grown in gardens and small farms for their own use and commercially. Even young stems and flowers are eaten. The seeds can also be eaten, they are among the pseudocereals. Due to the resistance to pests and disease and the higher crop yield, the plant appears as a good alternative to amaranth.

In one study it is shown that the silver fire-pot drives weeds out of fields. In particular, the grass plantations such as cereal or sorghum – infested root parasites of the African witch-herbs (genus Striga) (family of the brown-wort family) could be kept away from fields by common sowing with cockscomb. The yield was increased significantly. The mechanism appears to be a compound produced by C. argentea and functioning within several meters perimeter by means of inducing suicidal germination in Striga seed by as much as 68% compared to cotton which was taken as the standard.

The flowers are a traditional though now seldom-used garnish for desserts, rice cakes and flower-infused alcoholic beverages in Korea.

Chemical Composition
Chemical components include water, vitamin C, carotenoids, protein, nitrate, and oxalate. In addition, triterpene saponins could be detected in the roots and seeds of the silver fire. Sugar was found in the root, and flavonoids in leaves and stems. The seeds showed a diuretic effect. Yellow inflorescences of cristata and plumosa may contain high doses of dopamine. Celosian, a polysaccharide from the seeds of the cockscomb tuft, shows the animal model hepatoprotective and immunostimulating effects as well as the aqueous extract from the seeds, wherein also an anti-metastatic effect in the liver of mice could be detected.

Gallery

See also
Celosia argentea

References  

argentea var. cristata
Plants described in 1753
Taxa named by Carl Linnaeus